General elections were held in the British Virgin Islands on 20 August 2007. The result was a landslide victory for the opposition Virgin Islands Party (VIP) over the incumbent National Democratic Party (NDP).

The VIP took 7 of the 9 district seats (of the remaining district seats, only 1 was taking by the NDP; the other was taken by Alvin Christopher, an independent candidate endorsed by the VIP).  The VIP also took 3 out of the 4 territorial at-large seats.  The only two NDP candidates to retain their seats were former Chief Minister Orlando Smith and seventh district representative Kedrick Pickering.  VIP at-large candidate Zoë McMillan-Walcott had initially asked for a recount of her vote against Orlando Smith for the fourth at-large seat (the initial count indicated her to have received only 18 fewer votes), but she subsequently withdrew the request.

The victory gave the VIP an unprecedented 10 elected seats out of the 13 available in the House of Assembly of the British Virgin Islands, despite receiving only a mere 5.6% greater share of the votes than the NDP (45.2% to 39.6%).

Voter turnout was relatively high, with approximately 62.3% of registered voters casting votes; although this was some way lower than the 72.2% voter turnout for the 2003 election. The lowest turnout was in the fifth district, where only 49.3% of voters cast votes; the highest was the eighth district, where 76.2% turnout was recorded.

The Supervisor of elections reported that the elections passed off "without incident".

Results
Because of the NDP's high dependence upon At-large seats, a relatively small shift in voter sentiment turned a defeat into a massacre.  After winning all four At-large seats in the previous election, in 2007 the NDP could barely cling onto one with Orlando Smith eclipsing Zoë Walcott-McMillan by just 18 votes out of a total of ballots cast.  Dr Smith's election was the only thing that went right for the NDP on election day, with seemingly every other close race falling into the laps of the VIP, in each case snatching close victories in the Fourth, Fifth and Eighth Districts.

A variety of circumstances combined to convert the VIP's 45.2% of the electoral votes into 84.6% (11 out of 13) of the available seats once Alvin Christopher (who won as an independent) formally decided to rejoin his former party.

District seats
The results of the voting for the district seats was as follows:

Winning candidates are highlighted in blue.  Previously incumbent candidates are marked in bold.

 First electoral district

Total number of registered voters: 1,277
Total number of votes cast: 825 (64.6% turnout)

 Second Electoral District

Total number of registered voters: 1,143 
Total number of votes cast: 638 (55.9% turnout)

 Third Electoral District

Total number of registered voters: 1,235 
Total number of votes cast: 847 (68.6% turnout)

 Fourth Electoral District

Total number of registered voters: 1,226
Total number of votes cast: 798 (65.1% turnout)

 Fifth Electoral District

Total number of registered voters: 1,403
Total number of votes cast: 908 (64.7% turnout)

 Sixth Electoral District

Total number of registered voters: 1,363
Total number of votes cast: 873 (64.0% turnout)

 Seventh Electoral District

Total number of registered voters: 1,025
Total number of votes cast: 665 (64.9% turnout)

 Eighth Electoral District

Total number of registered voters: 1,125
Total number of votes cast: 864 (76.8% turnout)

 Ninth Electoral District

Total number of registered voters: 1,378
Total number of votes cast: 1,011 (73.4% turnout)
The ninth electoral district was the only district to undergo a recount.

(IND) = Independent candidate
(IPM) = Independent People's Movement
(NDP) = National Democratic Party candidate
(VIP) = Virgin Islands Party candidate

The closest races were in the fourth district (where only 27 votes separated the candidates), the fifth district (23 votes separated the leading candidates, and 87 votes went to independent candidates) and the ninth where a mere 9 votes separated the candidates (46 votes having gone to the independent candidate) and a recount was conducted.

Alvin Christopher received the highest percentage of votes for a territorial candidate (75.9%), whilst Andrew Fahie received the highest number of total votes.  Hubert O'Neal had the unhappy distinction of having the highest number of votes (467 votes, higher than 5 successful candidates) and the highest percentage of the vote (46.9%) for a losing territorial candidate.  Elvis "Jughead" Harrigan had the lowest number of votes (309) and percentage of vote (44.7%) for any successful territorial candidate.

Territorial At-Large Seats
The top four vote receiving candidates are elected to the at-large seats.

(IND) = Independent candidate
(IPM) = Independent People's Movement
(NDP) = National Democratic Party candidate
(VIP) = Virgin Islands Party candidate

Aftermath
On 22 August 2007, the Governor, Mr David Pearey officially appointed Ralph O'Neal as the first Premier (as the position of Chief Minister will be called) under section 52(1) the new constitution.  He became only the second person in BVI political history (after Lavity Stoutt) to serve two non-consecutive terms of office as Chief Minister/Premier, and only the third (Lavity Stoutt and Willard Wheatley) to win more than one general election as party leader (both since matched by Orlando Smith).  Both were considered remarkable achievements for a politician who was written off by some as a "spent force" after he lost the previous election at the age of 69.

Despite questions over how long Ralph O'Neal expects to serve as Premier, starting his term at the age of 73, he served the full term.  Rumours abounded prior to the election that a backroom deal may have been struck with Dancia Penn that she would take over the premiership when he stepped down, mid-term; a move that may presumably cause some internal consternation in the party.  Those rumours were further fuelled when Dancia Penn was appointed as Deputy Premier shortly after the election.

On 23 August 2007 the first cabinet was sworn in under Ralph O'Neal.
 In addition to serving as the Territory's first Premier Honourable Ralph T. O’Neal was appointed Minister of Finance and Tourism.
 Honourable Andrew Fahie was appointed Minister of Education and Culture
 Honourable Julian Fraser was appointed Minister of Communications and Works
 Honourable Omar Hodge was appointed Minister of Natural Resources and Labour
 Honourable Dancia Penn, OBE, QC was appointed Minister of Health and Social Development.

Sources: Platinum news; Government Press Release 323R/07

References

 BVI Platinum
 BVI News online

External links
Columnist comment on the election in The Standpoint

British Virgin
General election
Elections in the British Virgin Islands
2007 elections in British Overseas Territories
August 2007 events in North America